Lloyd Davies (23 February 1877–10 October 1957) was a Welsh footballer who played in the English Football League for Stoke and had a long career in the Southern League with Northampton Town. He also earned 16 caps for the Wales national team.

Career
Davies was born in Cefn Mawr and played for Rhosymedre St John's and Druids before joining Stoke in 1903. He played 7 matches in 1903–04 at outside left scoring three goals but then left Stoke in March 1904 for Wellington Town and then Swindon Town before returning to the Victoria Ground in December 1905. He played 26 matches for Stoke in 1906–07 which saw him occupy the full back position but was not very successful as Stoke suffered relegation from the First Division. He then joined Northampton Town where he would go on to enjoy a 12-year spell making well over 320 appearances for the "Cobblers".

Three of his brothers also played for Wales: Joe (7 appearances), Robert (1 appearance) and Thomas (4 appearances).

Career statistics

Club
Source:

International
Source:

References

1877 births
1957 deaths
Welsh footballers
Wales international footballers
Druids F.C. players
Northampton Town F.C. players
Stoke City F.C. players
Swindon Town F.C. players
English Football League players
Southern Football League players
People from Ruabon
Sportspeople from Wrexham County Borough
Association football defenders